Keady is a village in County Armagh, Northern Ireland.

Keady may also refer to:

Places
Canada
Keady, Ontario
United Kingdom
Keady, County Fermanagh, a townland in County Fermanagh, Northern Ireland
Keady, County Londonderry, a townland in County Londonderry, Northern Ireland
Keady, County Tyrone, a townland in County Tyrone, Northern Ireland

See also
 Keady Lámh Dhearg Hurling Club
 Keady Michael Dwyer's GFC
 Keady railway station
 Keady (surname)